The Lincoln–Douglas debates were a series of seven debates between Abraham Lincoln, the Republican Party candidate for the United States Senate from Illinois, and incumbent Senator Stephen Douglas, the Democratic Party candidate. Until the Seventeenth Amendment to the United States Constitution, which provides that senators shall be elected by the people of their states, was ratified in 1913, senators were elected by their respective state legislatures, so Lincoln and Douglas were trying to win the votes of the Illinois General Assembly for their respective parties.

The debates were designed to generate publicity—some of the first examples of what later would be called media events. For Lincoln, they were an opportunity to raise both his national profile and that of the burgeoning Republican Party, while Douglas sought to defend his record—especially his leading role in the doctrine of popular sovereignty and its incarnation in the Kansas–Nebraska Act of 1854. The candidates spoke in each of Illinois's nine congressional districts. Both candidates had already spoken in Springfield and Chicago within a day of each other, so they decided that their joint appearances would be held in the remaining seven districts. Since Douglas was the incumbent he had very little to gain from these debates. However, Lincoln, only a one term congressman, was gaining support by speaking a day after Douglas and thus presenting a rejoinder Douglas could not answer. Furthermore, "The Lincoln newspapers [those papers which formally supported Lincoln] wasted no time in condemning Douglas for not agreeing to the debates and branded him a coward. Political debates were part of the Prairie tradition and any serious political candidate was expected to put on a fine performance." Each debate lasted about three hours; one candidate spoke for 60 minutes, followed by a 90-minute response and a final 30-minute rejoinder by the first candidate. The candidates alternated speaking first. As the incumbent, Douglas spoke first in four of the debates. They were held outdoors, weather permitting, from about 2 to 5 p.m. There were fields full of listeners.

The debates focused on slavery, specifically whether it would be allowed in the new states to be formed from the territory acquired through the Louisiana Purchase and the Mexican Cession. Douglas, as the Democratic candidate, held that the decision should be made by the residents of the new states themselves rather than by the federal government (popular sovereignty). Lincoln argued against the expansion of slavery, yet stressed that he was not advocating its abolition where it already existed.

Never in American history had there been newspaper coverage of such intensity. Both candidates felt they were talking to the whole nation. New technology was readily available: railroads, the telegraph, and Pitman shorthand, at the time called phonography. The state's largest newspapers, from Chicago, sent phonographers (stenographers) to report complete texts of each debate; thanks to the new railroads, the debates were not hard to reach from Chicago. Halfway through each debate, runners were handed the stenographers' notes. They raced for the next train to Chicago, handing them to riding stenographers who during the journey converted the shorthand back into words, producing a transcript ready for the Chicago typesetter and for the telegrapher, who sent it to the rest of the country (east of the Rockies) as soon as it arrived. The next train brought the conclusion. The papers published the speeches in full, sometimes within hours of their delivery. Some newspapers helped their own candidate with minor corrections, reports on the audience's positive reaction, or tendentious headlines ("New and Powerful Argument by Mr. Lincoln—Douglas Tells the Same Old Story"). The newswire of the Associated Press sent messages simultaneously to multiple points, so newspapers all across the country (east of the Rocky Mountains) printed them, and the debates quickly became national events. They were republished as pamphlets.

The debates took place between August and October 1858. Newspapers reported 12,000 in attendance at Ottawa, 16,000 to 18,000 in Galesburg, 15,000 in Freeport,
12,000 in Quincy, and at the last one, in Alton, 5,000 to 10,000. The debates near Illinois's borders (Freeport, Quincy, and Alton) drew large numbers of people from neighboring states. A number travelled within Illinois to follow the debates.

Douglas was re-elected by the Illinois General Assembly, 54–46. But the publicity made Lincoln a national figure and laid the groundwork for his 1860 presidential campaign.

As part of that endeavor, Lincoln edited the texts of all the debates and had them published in a book. It sold well and helped him receive the Republican Party's nomination for president at the 1860 Republican National Convention in Chicago.

Background
Douglas had first been elected to the United States Senate in 1846, and he was seeking re-election for a third term in 1858. The issue of slavery was raised several times during his tenure in the Senate, particularly with respect to the Compromise of 1850. As chairman of the committee on U.S. territories, he argued for an approach to slavery called popular sovereignty: electorates in the territories would vote whether to adopt or reject slavery. Decisions previously had been made at the federal level concerning slavery in the territories. Douglas was successful with passage of the Kansas–Nebraska Act in 1854. The Gilder Lehrman Institute of American History's Mr. Lincoln and Friends Society notes that prominent Bloomington, Illinois resident Jesse W. Fell, a local real estate developer who founded the Bloomington Pantagraph and who befriended Lincoln in 1834, had suggested the debates in 1854.

Lincoln had also been elected to Congress in 1846, and he served a two-year term in the House of Representatives. During his time in the House, he disagreed with Douglas and supported the Wilmot Proviso, which sought to ban slavery in any new territory. He returned to politics in the 1850s to oppose the Kansas–Nebraska Act and to help develop the new Republican Party.

Before the debates, Lincoln charged that Douglas was encouraging fears of amalgamation of the races, with enough success to drive thousands of people away from the Republican Party. Douglas replied that Lincoln was an abolitionist for saying that the American Declaration of Independence applied to blacks as well as whites.

Lincoln argued in his House Divided Speech that Douglas was part of a conspiracy to nationalize slavery. Lincoln said that ending the Missouri Compromise ban on slavery in Kansas and Nebraska was the first step in this nationalizing and that the Dred Scott decision was another step in the direction of spreading slavery into Northern territories. He expressed the fear that any similar Supreme Court decision would turn Illinois into a slave state.

Much has been written of Lincoln's rhetorical style but, going into the debates, Douglas's reputation was a daunting one. As James G. Blaine later wrote:

The debates

When Lincoln made the debates into a book, in 1860, he included the following material as preliminaries:
 Speech at Springfield by Lincoln, June 16, the "Lincoln's House Divided Speech" speech (in the volume, the erroneous date June 17 is given)
 Speech at Chicago by Douglas, July 9
 Speech at Chicago by Lincoln, July 10
 Speech at Bloomington by Douglas, July 16
 Speech at Springfield by Douglas, July 17 (Lincoln was not present)
 Speech at Springfield by Lincoln, July 17 (Douglas was not present)
 Preliminary correspondence of Lincoln and Douglas, July 24–31

The debates were held in seven towns in the state of Illinois:
 Ottawa on August 21
 Freeport on August 27
 Jonesboro on September 15
 Charleston on September 18
 Galesburg on October 7
 Quincy on October 13
 Alton on October 15

Slavery was the main theme of the Lincoln–Douglas debates, particularly the issue of slavery's expansion into the territories. Douglas's Kansas–Nebraska Act repealed the Missouri Compromise's ban on slavery in the territories of Kansas and Nebraska and replaced it with the doctrine of popular sovereignty, which meant that the people of a territory would vote as to whether to allow slavery. During the debates, both Lincoln and Douglas appealed to the "Fathers" (Founding Fathers) to bolster their cases.

Ottawa

Lincoln said at Ottawa:

Lincoln said in the first debate, in Ottawa, that popular sovereignty would nationalize and perpetuate slavery. Douglas replied that both Whigs and Democrats believed in popular sovereignty and that the Compromise of 1850 was an example of this. Lincoln said that the national policy was to limit the spread of slavery, and he mentioned the Northwest Ordinance of 1787 as an example of this policy, which banned slavery from a large part of the Midwest.

The Compromise of 1850 allowed the territories of Utah and New Mexico to decide for or against slavery, but it also allowed the admission of California as a free state, reduced the size of the slave state of Texas by adjusting the boundary, and ended the slave trade (but not slavery itself) in the District of Columbia. In return, the South got a stronger Fugitive Slave Law than the version mentioned in the Constitution. Douglas said that the Compromise of 1850 replaced the Missouri Compromise's ban on slavery in the Louisiana Purchase territory north and west of the state of Missouri, while Lincoln said—a topic he went back to in the Jonesboro debate—that Douglas was mistaken in seeing "Popular Sovereignty" and the Dred Scott decision as being in harmony with the Compromise of 1850. To the contrary, "Popular Sovereignty" would nationalize slavery.

There were partisan remarks, such as Douglas's accusations that members of the "Black Republican" party were abolitionists, including Lincoln, and he cited as proof Lincoln's House Divided Speech, in which he said, "I believe this government cannot endure permanently half slave and half free." Douglas also charged Lincoln with opposing the Dred Scott decision because "it deprives the negro of the rights and privileges of citizenship." Lincoln responded that "the next Dred Scott decision" could allow slavery to spread into free states. Douglas accused Lincoln of wanting to overthrow state laws that excluded Blacks from states such as Illinois, which were popular with the northern Democrats. Lincoln did not argue for complete social equality, but he did say that Douglas ignored the basic humanity of Blacks and that slaves did have an equal right to liberty, stating "I agree with Judge Douglas he is not my equal in many respects—certainly not in color, perhaps not in moral or intellectual endowment.  But in the right to eat the bread, without the leave of anybody else, which his own hand earns, he is my equal and the equal of Judge Douglas, and the equal of every living man."

Lincoln said that he did not know how emancipation should happen. He believed in colonization in Africa by emancipated slaves, but admitted that it was impractical. He said that it would be wrong for emancipated slaves to be treated as "underlings", but that there was a large opposition to social and political equality and that "a universal feeling, whether well or ill-founded, cannot be safely disregarded." He said that Douglas's public indifference would result in the expansion of slavery because it would mold public sentiment to accept it. As Lincoln said, "public sentiment is everything. With public sentiment, nothing can fail; without it, nothing can succeed. Consequently he who molds public sentiment goes deeper than he who enacts statutes or pronounces decisions. He makes statutes and decisions possible or impossible to be executed." He said that Douglas "cares not whether slavery is voted down or voted up," and that he would "blow out the moral lights around us" and eradicate the love of liberty.

Freeport

At the debate at Freeport, Lincoln forced Douglas to choose between two options, either of which would damage Douglas's popularity and chances of getting reelected. He asked Douglas to reconcile popular sovereignty with the Supreme Court's Dred Scott decision. Douglas responded that the people of a territory could keep slavery out even though the Supreme Court said that the federal government had no authority to exclude slavery, simply by refusing to pass a slave code and other legislation needed to protect slavery. Douglas alienated Southerners with this Freeport Doctrine, which damaged his chances of winning the Presidency in 1860. As a result, Southern politicians used their demand for a slave code to drive a wedge between the Northern and Southern wings of the Democratic Party, splitting the majority political party in 1858.

Douglas failed to gain support in all sections of the country through popular sovereignty. By allowing slavery where the majority wanted it, he lost the support of Republicans led by Lincoln, who thought that Douglas was unprincipled. He lost the support of the South by rejecting the pro-slavery Lecompton Constitution and advocating a Freeport Doctrine to stop slavery in Kansas, where the majority were anti-slavery.

Jonesboro
In his address in Jonesboro, Lincoln said that the expansion of slavery would endanger the Union, and mentioned the controversies over slavery in Missouri in 1820, in the territories conquered from Mexico that led to the Compromise of 1850, and again with the Bleeding Kansas controversy. He said that the crisis would be reached and passed when slavery was put "in the course of ultimate extinction."

Charleston
Before the debate at Charleston, Democrats held up a banner that read "Negro equality" with a picture of a white man, a negro woman, and a mulatto child.

Lincoln began his address by clarifying that his concerns about slavery did not equate to support for racial equality. He stated:

In his subsequent response, Stephen Douglas said that Lincoln had an ally in Frederick Douglass in preaching "abolition doctrines." He said that Frederick Douglass told "all the friends of negro equality and negro citizenship to rally as one man around Abraham Lincoln." He also charged Lincoln with a lack of consistency when speaking on the issue of racial equality (in the Charleston debate) and cited Lincoln's previous statements that the declaration that all men are created equal applies to blacks as well as whites.

In response to Douglas's questioning of Lincoln's support of negro citizenship, if not full equality, Lincoln further clarified in his rejoinder: "I tell him very frankly that I am not in favor of negro citizenship."

Galesburg
At Galesburg, using quotes from Lincoln's Chicago address, Douglas sought again to prove that Lincoln was an abolitionist because of his insistence upon the principle that "all men are equal".

Alton
At Alton, Lincoln tried to reconcile his statements on equality. He said that the authors of the Declaration of Independence "intended to include all men, but they did not mean to declare all men equal in all respects." As Lincoln said, "They meant to set up a standard maxim for the free society which should be familiar to all,—constantly looked to, constantly labored for, and even, though never perfectly attained, constantly approximated, and thereby constantly spreading and deepening its influence, and augmenting the happiness and value of life to all people, of all colors, everywhere." He contrasted his support for the Declaration with opposing statements made by John C. Calhoun and Senator John Pettit of Indiana, who called the Declaration "a self-evident lie". Lincoln said that Chief Justice Roger Taney and Stephen Douglas were opposing Thomas Jefferson's self-evident truth, dehumanizing blacks and preparing the public mind to think of them as only property. Lincoln thought that slavery had to be treated as a wrong and kept from growing.

As Lincoln said at Alton: These words were set to music by Aaron Copland in his Lincoln Portrait.

Lincoln used a number of colorful phrases in the debates. He said that one argument by Douglas made a horse chestnut into a chestnut horse, and he compared an evasion by Douglas to the sepia cloud from a cuttlefish. In Quincy, Lincoln said that Douglas's Freeport Doctrine was do-nothing sovereignty that was "as thin as the homeopathic soup that was made by boiling the shadow of a pigeon that had starved to death."

The role of technology
Recent improvements in technology were fundamental to the debates' success and popularity. New railroads connected major cities at high speeds—a message that on a horse would have taken a week arrived in hours. A forgotten "soft" technology, Pitman shorthand, allowed writing to keep up with speech, far closer to a recording than had been possible before. Finally, messages could now be sent via the electrical telegraph, anywhere east of the Rocky Mountains. "The combination of shorthand, the telegraph and the railroad changed everything," wrote Allen C. Guelzo, author of Lincoln and Douglas: The Debates That Defined America. "It was unprecedented. Lincoln and Douglas knew they were speaking to the whole nation. It was like JFK in 1960 coming to grips with the presence of the vast new television audience."

Results

The October surprise of the election was former Whig John J. Crittenden's endorsement of Douglas. Non-Republican former Whigs comprised the biggest block of swing voters, and Crittenden's endorsement of Douglas rather than Lincoln reduced Lincoln's chances of winning.

The districts were drawn to favor Douglas's party, and the Democrats won 40 seats in the state House of Representatives while the Republicans won 35. In the State Senate, Republicans held 11 seats and Democrats held 14. Douglas was re-elected by the legislature 54–46, even though Republican candidates for the state legislature together received 24,094 more votes than candidates supporting Douglas. However, the widespread media coverage of the debates greatly raised Lincoln's national profile, making him a viable candidate for nomination as the Republican candidate in the upcoming 1860 presidential election.

Ohio Republican committee chairman George Parsons put Lincoln in touch with Ohio's main political publisher, Follett and Foster, of Columbus. It published copies of the text in Political Debates Between Hon. Abraham Lincoln and Hon. Stephen A. Douglas in the Celebrated Campaign of 1858, in Illinois. Four printings were made, and the fourth sold 16,000 copies.

Commemoration

The debate locations in Illinois feature plaques and statuary of Douglas and Lincoln.

There is a Lincoln–Douglas Debate Museum in Charleston.

In 1994, C-SPAN aired a series of re-enactments of the debates filmed on location.

In 2008, BBC Audiobooks America recorded David Strathairn (Lincoln) and Richard Dreyfuss (Douglas) reenacting the debates.

See also
Bleeding Kansas

Notes

Further reading
 On January 1, 2009, BBC Audiobooks America, published the first complete recording of the Lincoln–Douglas Debates, starring actors David Strathairn as Abraham Lincoln and Richard Dreyfuss as Stephen Douglas with an introduction by Allen C. Guelzo, Henry R. Luce III Professor of the Civil War Era at Gettysburg College. The text of the recording was provided courtesy of the Abraham Lincoln Association as presented in The Collected Works of Abraham Lincoln.
 Jaffa, Harry V. (1957). "Expediency and Morality in The Lincoln-Douglas Debates," The Anchor Review, No. 2, pp. 177–204.

External links

 Website of the Stephen A. Douglas Association
 Original Manuscripts and Primary Sources: Lincoln-Douglas Debates, First Edition 1860 Shapell Manuscript Foundation
 Digital History (archived link)
 Bartleby Etext: Political Debates Between Abraham Lincoln and Stephen A. Douglas
 The Lincoln–Douglas Debates of 1858
 Mr. Lincoln and Freedom: Lincoln–Douglas Debates
 Abraham Lincoln: A Resource Guide from the Library of Congress
 Free audio book of "Noted Speeches of Abraham Lincoln," including the Lincoln-Douglas Debates.
 Booknotes interview with Harold Holzer on The Lincoln-Douglas Debates, August 22, 1993.
 Lincoln Douglas Debate Transcripts on the Internet Archive
 Conceptions of race central to Lincoln-Douglas debates – Pantagraph (Bloomington, Illinois newspaper)

Political history of Illinois
1858 United States Senate elections
Speeches by Abraham Lincoln
Political debates
Presidents of the United States and slavery
Alton, Illinois
Coles County, Illinois 
Freeport, Illinois
Galesburg, Illinois
Ottawa, Illinois
Quincy, Illinois
Union County, Illinois 
1858 in Illinois
Origins of the American Civil War
1858 in the United States
Legal history of Kansas